Jon P. McGlocklin (born June 10, 1943) is an American former professional basketball player. Born in Franklin, Indiana, McGlocklin spent over a decade in the National Basketball Association (NBA) after being drafted by the Cincinnati Royals in 1965. He is best known, however, for his six-decade association with the Milwaukee Bucks. He played the last eight seasons of his career in Milwaukee, making the NBA All-Star Game in 1969 and helping lead the Bucks to the 1971 NBA title. After retiring from the NBA in 1976, McGlocklin went on to become a television commentator for the Bucks, also having his number retired by the franchise.

Playing career
A sharpshooting 6'5" guard from Indiana University, McGlockin was selected by the Cincinnati Royals in the third round of the 1965 NBA draft. After two seasons there, he was left unprotected in the 1967 expansion draft and selected by the San Diego Rockets. He only stayed one season in San Diego before being left unprotected in the 1968 expansion draft, in which he was taken by the Milwaukee Bucks.

McGlocklin stayed in Milwaukee for eight years, helping lead the Bucks to the NBA Championship (as a teammate of Kareem Abdul-Jabbar and Oscar Robertson) in 1971. He scored 9,169 points in his NBA career, and his #14 jersey has been retired by the Bucks franchise. He also represented the Bucks in the 1969 NBA All-Star Game.

McGlocklin was best known for his high-arcing "rainbow" jump shot from the wings, in what would now be three-point territory. It was most effective when paired in a two-man play with Jabbar: if the opposing guard fell back to double-team Jabbar, McGlocklin would make them pay from the perimeter; when the guard came out to defend him, he would pass the ball down to Jabbar with only one defender, who under most circumstances was out-matched.

McGlocklin was selected as one of the "Top 50 Basketball Players" of the 20th Century, in his home state of Indiana, as well as being inducted into the Indiana Basketball Hall of Fame, Wisconsin Basketball Coaches Association and the Wisconsin Athletic Hall of Fame.

Announcing
McLocklin retired at the end of the 1975–76 season; he was the last member of the Bucks' inaugural roster still on the team. He immediately joined the Bucks' television broadcast team as color commentator, a post he has held for 45 years. He and play-by-play announcer Jim Paschke called Bucks games together for 35 years until Paschke's retirement at the end of the 2020–21 season.

Having been associated with the Bucks franchise for every year of its existence, he is often called  "Mr. Buck" by Bucks fans.

Business and charity
On the night of his retirement in 1976, McLocklin, along with Eddie Doucette founded the MACC Fund, which has become nationally recognized in its fight against childhood cancer and has raised over $45 million toward childhood cancer research.

Both he and Sal Bando established the Bando McGlocklin Capital Corporation in 1979. The firm was renamed The Middleton Doll Company on May 4, 2001, to reflect its acquisition of Lee Middleton Original Dolls Inc.

NBA career statistics

Regular season

Playoffs

References

External links

 Profile at *www.nba.com/bucks
  Indiana Basketball Hall of Fame profile

1943 births
Living people
American men's basketball players
Basketball players from Indiana
Cincinnati Royals draft picks
Cincinnati Royals players
Indiana Hoosiers men's basketball players
Milwaukee Bucks announcers
Milwaukee Bucks expansion draft picks
Milwaukee Bucks players
National Basketball Association All-Stars
National Basketball Association broadcasters
National Basketball Association players with retired numbers
People from Franklin, Indiana
San Diego Rockets expansion draft picks
San Diego Rockets players
Shooting guards
Small forwards